Eventually may refer to:

Music

Albums 
 Eventually (album), 1996  album

Songs 
 "Eventually", by Ornette Coleman from The Shape of Jazz to Come
 "Eventually", by Pink from Missundaztood
 "Eventually", by Don McLean from And I Love You So
 "Eventually", by The Naked Brothers Band from I Don't Want to Go to School
 "Eventually", by Tame Impala from Currents

Other uses 
 Eventually (mathematics), a mathematical concept